The South Ferry station was an elevated station at the southern terminal of the IRT Second, Third, Sixth and Ninth Avenue Lines. It was located next to Battery Park at the lower tip of Manhattan, New York City. Two tracks came from the combined Second and Third Avenue Lines, and two from the Sixth and Ninth Avenue Lines, making four tracks at the terminal, with platforms on the outside and between each pair of tracks (no platform in the center).

The station was right above access to various ferries at South Ferry, at both the Battery Maritime Building and the Whitehall Terminal. The next stop on the Second and Third Avenue Lines was Hanover Square. The next stop on the Sixth and Ninth Avenue Lines was Battery Place.

The first elevated station at South Ferry was opened April 5, 1877 by the New York Elevated Railroad. It had one island platform between two tracks and was operated as an extension of the company's Ninth Avenue Line. The tracks were later continued straight into the company's Third Avenue Line, which opened August 26, 1878. The four-track station, opened March 1879, was built to provide an adequate terminal for both lines. It was located on a very short branch line, at right angles to the old station, facing toward the ferry terminals. Later the Second and Sixth Avenue Lines also used the terminal. A fire at the station in 1919 damaged the Whitehall Street Terminal.

Ridership on the els began to decline as subway stations were replacing them. The Sixth Avenue Line was eliminated from the station in 1938, the Ninth Avenue Line in 1940, and the Second Avenue Line in 1942. When the Third Avenue Line was eliminated in 1950, the station was permanently closed. The station site is currently occupied by the South Ferry subway station.

References

External links

South Ferry Station; Third Avenue El (NYCSubway.org)

IRT Second Avenue Line stations
IRT Third Avenue Line stations
IRT Sixth Avenue Line stations
IRT Ninth Avenue Line stations

Railway stations in the United States opened in 1877

Railway stations closed in 1950
1877 establishments in New York (state)
1950 disestablishments in New York (state)
Former elevated and subway stations in Manhattan